Crazy for You is the 8th studio album by Earl Klugh, released in 1981. This is the first album which Klugh produced by himself. The album received two Grammy nominations at the 25th Grammy Awards in 1983; for Best Pop Instrumental Performance, and for Best Arrangement on an Instrumental Recording, the latter shared jointly by Klugh, keyboardist Ronnie Foster, and string arranger Clare Fischer.

Track listing 
All songs written by Earl Klugh.
 "I'm Ready for Your Love" – 3:20
 "Soft Stuff (And Other Sweet Delights)" – 5:09
 "Twinkle" – 5:21
 "Broadway Ramble" – 4:30
 "Calypso Getaway" – 3:14
 "The Rainmaker" – 5:15
 "Balladina" – 4:19
 "Crazy for You" – 4:04

Charts

References 

1981 albums
Earl Klugh albums